Bord Khun Rural District is in Bord Khun District of Deyr County, Bushehr province, Iran. At the census of 2006, its population was 1,115 in 234 households; there were 1,160 inhabitants in 281 households at the following census of 2011; and in the most recent census of 2016, the population of the rural district was 1,428 in 394 households. The largest of its 23 villages was Bord Khun-e Kohneh, with 826 people.

References 

Rural Districts of Bushehr Province
Populated places in Deyr County